Batumi Stalin Museum was a museum in Batumi, Georgia. It commemorated Joseph Stalin, who was active in socialist agitation among Batumi's refinery workers during 1901–1902. It closed in 2013, after suffering low visitation.

See also
 List of museums in Georgia (country)

References

Museums in Batumi
Defunct museums
Places associated with Joseph Stalin
History museums in Georgia (country)
Museums disestablished in 2013